Donald Alphonsus Campbell (1894–1963) was a Scottish prelate who served as the Roman Catholic Archbishop of Glasgow from 1945 to 1963.

Life
Born in Bohuntine, Glen Roy, Inverness-shire on 8 December 1894, he was ordained to the priesthood on 3 April 1920.  Campbell's first assignment was at St Andrew's Cathedral, Glasgow. From there he went to St Mary's Cathedral, Aberdeen, and later to the Diocese of Argyll and the Isles, where he served as assistant at Rothesay and Roybridge before being appointed parish priest at Castlebay on Barra, and later at Daliburgh on South Uist. 

Campbell was appointed Bishop of the Diocese of Argyll and the Isles by the Holy See on 5 October 1939, succeeding a kinsman, Bishop Donald Martin. He was consecrated to the episcopate on 14 December 1939. The principal consecrator was Archbishop Andrew Thomas McDonald of Saint Andrews and Edinburgh, and the principal co-consecrators were Bishop George Henry Bennett of Aberdeen and Bishop William Henry Mellon of Galloway.

Six years later, he was translated to the Metropolitan see of Glasgow as archbishop on 6 January 1945. St. Peter's College, the diocesan seminary burned down in 1946; Campbell later participated in the ground-breaking for its successor, St Peter's Seminary, Cardross. He also participated in laying the foundation stone for the new Scots College in Rome.

The suffragan sees of Motherwell and Paisley were created from Glasgow in 1948, thus making the archdiocese a metropolitan see.

In 1952, Archbishop Campbell described Marshal Tito as a "modern Nero". He attended the first session of the Second Vatican Council in 1962.

Campbell died at the age of 68 on 22 July 1963, at while leading the annual diocesan pilgrimage to Lourdes.

References
 

1894 births
1963 deaths
Roman Catholic archbishops of Glasgow
Participants in the Second Vatican Council
People from Argyll and Bute
Roman Catholic bishops of Argyll and the Isles
20th-century Roman Catholic archbishops in the United Kingdom